Poimenesperus fulvomarmoratus is a species of beetle in the family Cerambycidae. It was first described in 1894.

References

fulvomarmoratus
Beetles described in 1894